WTAS-LD (channel 23) is a low-power television station licensed to Waukesha, Wisconsin, United States, serving the Milwaukee area. The station is owned by Waukesha Tower Associates, and maintains transmitter facilities on Beeheim Road southeast of Waukesha.

History 
The station signed on the air in 1990 as W43AV on analog channel 43. It changed its call sign to WTAS-LP in 1996, and moved to channel 47 in 2004. In the analog age, it had a small coverage area consisting of Waukesha itself, and because of overall intermittent operation, was only available over the air.

The station was issued a construction permit for a digital signal in September 2018, and began to transmit only in digital in July 2021 on channel 23, just before the complete end of analog television in the United States. The digital signal covers Milwaukee County and most of the population centers of Waukesha County. WTAS-LP was the final analog television station to go off the air in eastern Wisconsin.

Subchannels 
The station's digital signal is multiplexed:

References

External links 
History of Milwaukee television

TAS-LD
Television channels and stations established in 1989
1989 establishments in Wisconsin
Independent television stations in the United States
Low-power television stations in the United States